Åkullsjön is a small village in Robertsfors Municipality, Västerbotten, Sweden.

External links
Åkullsjön Homepage

Populated places in Västerbotten County